Karabanovo is a town in Alexandrovsky District of Vladimir Oblast, Russia, located on the left bank of the Seraya River (a tributary of the Sherna in Klyazma's drainage basin),  west of Vladimir, the administrative center of the oblast. Population:

History
It was founded in 1846 as a settlement serving the dye works. Town status was granted to it in 1938.

Administrative and municipal status
Within the framework of administrative divisions, Karabanovo is directly subordinated to Alexandrovsky District. As a municipal division, the town of Karabanovo is incorporated within Alexandrovsky Municipal District as Karabanovo Urban Settlement.

References

Notes

Sources

External links

Official website of Karabanovo 
Karabanovo Business Directory  

Cities and towns in Vladimir Oblast
Alexandrovsky Uyezd (Vladimir Governorate)